BlackRock, Inc. is an American multi-national investment company based in New York City. Founded in 1988, initially as a risk management and fixed income institutional asset manager, BlackRock is the world's largest asset manager, with  trillion in assets under management as of January 2022. BlackRock operates globally with 70 offices in 30 countries, and clients in 100 countries. Along with Vanguard and State Street, BlackRock is considered to be one of the Big Three index fund managers that dominate  America.

BlackRock has sought to position itself as an industry leader in environmental, social and corporate governance (ESG). The company has faced criticism for worsening climate change, its close ties with the Federal Reserve System during the COVID-19 pandemic, anticompetitive behavior, and its unprecedented investments in China.

History

1988–2022
BlackRock was founded in 1988 by Larry Fink, Robert S. Kapito, Susan Wagner, Barbara Novick, Ben Golub, Hugh Frater, Ralph Schlosstein, and Keith Anderson to provide institutional clients with asset management services from a risk management perspective. Fink, Kapito, Golub and Novick had worked together at First Boston, where Fink and his team were pioneers in the mortgage-backed securities market in the United States. During Fink's tenure, he had lost $90 million as head of First Boston. That experience was the motivation to develop what he and the others considered to be excellent risk management and fiduciary practices. Initially, Fink sought funding (for initial operating capital) from Pete Peterson of The Blackstone Group who believed in Fink's vision of a firm devoted to risk management. Peterson called it Blackstone Financial Management. In exchange for a 50 percent stake in the bond business, initially Blackstone gave Fink and his team a $5 million credit line. Within months, the business had turned profitable, and by 1989 the group's assets had quadrupled to $2.7 billion. The percent of the stake owned by Blackstone also fell to 40%, compared to Fink's staff.

By 1992, Blackstone had a stake equating to about 35% of the company, and Stephen A. Schwarzman and Fink were considering selling shares to the public. The firm adopted the name BlackRock, and was managing $17 billion in assets by the end of the year. At the end of 1994, BlackRock was managing $53 billion. In 1994, Schwarzman and Fink had an internal dispute over methods of compensation and equity. Fink wanted to share equity with new hires, to lure talent from banks, unlike Schwarzman, who did not want to further lower Blackstone's stake. They agreed to part ways, and Schwarzman sold BlackRock, a decision he later called a "heroic mistake." In June 1994, Blackstone sold a mortgage-securities unit with $23 billion in assets to PNC Bank Corp. for $240 million. The unit had traded mortgages and other fixed-income assets, and during the sales process the unit changed its name from Blackstone Financial Management to BlackRock Financial Management. Schwarzman remained with Blackstone, while Fink went on to become chairman and CEO of BlackRock Inc.

1999–2009 
BlackRock went public in 1999 at $14 a share on the New York Stock Exchange. By the end of 1999, BlackRock was managing $165 billion in assets. BlackRock grew both organically and by acquisition. In August 2004, BlackRock made its first major acquisition, buying State Street Research & Management's holding company SSRM Holdings, Inc. from MetLife for $325 million in cash and $50 million in stock. The acquisition raised BlackRock's assets under management from $314 billion to $325 billion. The deal included the mutual-fund business State Street Research & Management in 2005. BlackRock merged with Merrill Lynch Investment Managers (MLIM) in 2006, halving PNC's ownership and giving Merrill Lynch a 49.5% stake in the company. In October 2007, BlackRock acquired the fund-of-funds business of Quellos Capital Management.

The U.S. government contracted with BlackRock to help resolve the fallout of the financial meltdown of 2008. According to Vanity Fair, the financial establishment in Washington and on Wall Street believed BlackRock was the best choice for the job. The Federal Reserve allowed BlackRock to superintend the $130 billion-debt settlement of Bear Stearns and American International Group.

In 2009, BlackRock first became the No. 1 asset manager worldwide. In April 2009, BlackRock acquired R3 Capital Management, LLC and took control of the $1.5 billion fund. On 12 June 2009, Barclays sold its Global Investors unit (BGI), which included its exchange traded fund business, iShares, to BlackRock for US$13.5 billion. Through the deal, Barclays attained a near-20% stake in BlackRock.

2010–2019
In 2010, Ralph Schlosstein, the CEO of Evercore Partners and a BlackRock founder, called BlackRock "the most influential financial institution in the world." On 1 April 2011, due to Sanofi's acquisition of Genzyme, BlackRock replaced it on the S&P 500 index.

In 2013, Fortune listed BlackRock on its annual list of the world's 50 Most Admired Companies. In 2014, The Economist said that BlackRock's $4 trillion under management made it the "world's biggest asset manager", and it was larger than the world's largest bank, the Industrial and Commercial Bank of China, with $3 trillion. In May of the same year, BlackRock invested in Snapdeal.

In December 2014 a BlackRock managing director in London was banned by the British Financial Conduct Authority for failing the "fit and proper" test, because he paid £43,000 to avoid prosecution for dodging train fares. In response to the incident, BlackRock said, "Jonathan Burrows left BlackRock earlier this year. What he admitted to the FCA is totally contrary to our values and principles."

At the end of 2014, the Sovereign Wealth Fund Institute reported that 65% of Blackrock's assets under management were made up of institutional investors.

By June 30, 2015, BlackRock had US$4.721 trillion of assets under management. On August 26, 2015, BlackRock entered into a definitive agreement to acquire FutureAdvisor, a digital wealth management provider with reported assets under management of $600 million. Under the deal, FutureAdvisor would operate as a business within BlackRock Solutions (BRS). BlackRock announced in November 2015 that they would wind down the BlackRock Global Ascent hedge fund after losses. The Global Ascent fund had been its only dedicated global macro fund, as BlackRock was "better known for its mutual funds and exchange traded funds." At the time, BlackRock managed $51 billion in hedge funds, with $20 billion of that in funds of hedge funds.

In March 2017, the Financial Times announced that BlackRock, after a six-month review led by Mark Wiseman, had initiated a restructuring of its $8bn actively-managed fund business, resulting in the departure of seven portfolio managers and a $25m charge in Q2, replacing certain funds with quantitative investment strategies. In May 2017, BlackRock increased its stake in both CRH plc and Bank of Ireland. By April 2017, iShares business accounted for $1.41tn, or 26 percent, of BlackRock's total assets under management, and 37 percent of BlackRock's base fee income. In April 2017, BlackRock backed the inclusion of mainland Chinese shares in MSCI's global index for the first time.

Between October and December 2018, BlackRock's assets dropped by US$468bn and fell below $6tn. It was the largest decline between quarters since September 2011.

As of 2019, BlackRock holds 4.81% of Deutsche Bank, making it the single largest shareholder. This investment goes back to at least 2016.

In May 2019, BlackRock received criticism for the environmental impact of its holdings. It is counted among the top three shareholders in every oil "supermajor" except Total, and it is among the top 10 shareholders in 7 of the 10 biggest coal producers.

Since 2020 
In  his 2020 annual open letter, Fink announced environmental sustainability as a core goal for BlackRock's future investment decisions. BlackRock disclosed plans to sell US$500 million in coal investments.

In March 2020, the Federal Reserve chose BlackRock to manage two corporate bond-buying programs in response to the coronavirus pandemic, the $500 billion Primary Market Corporate Credit Facility (PMCCF) and the Secondary Market Corporate Credit Facility (SMCCF), as well as purchase by the Federal Reserve System of commercial mortgage-backed securities (CMBS) guaranteed by Government National Mortgage Association, Federal National Mortgage Association, or Federal Home Loan Mortgage Corporation.

In August 2020, BlackRock received approval from the China Securities Regulatory Commission to set up a mutual fund business in the country. This made BlackRock the first global asset manager to get consent from the Chinese government to start operations in the country.

In January 2020, PNC  sold its stake in BlackRock.

As of 2021, BlackRock owns 7.50% of HSBC Holdings plc, making it the second single largest shareholder after Ping An Insurance.

On December 28, 2022, it was announced BlackRock and Volodymyr Zelensky had been in contact for several months and that BlackRock was to play a principal role in Ukraine's reconstruction. The arrangement was criticized, with BlackRock being accused of "cashing in" on Ukrainian destruction.

Ownership and transparency
BlackRock invests the funds of its clients (for example, the owners of iShares ETF units) in numerous publicly traded companies, some of which compete with each other. Because of the size of BlackRock's funds, the company frequently appears among the top shareholders of these companies, such as technology companies Apple (BlackRock is listed as owning 6.34%) and Microsoft (6.77%), and financial services firms Wells Fargo (4.30%) and JPMorgan Chase (4.41%). BlackRock states these shares are ultimately owned by the company's clients, not by BlackRock itself – a view shared by multiple independent academics – but acknowledges it can exercise shareholder votes on behalf of these clients, in many cases without client input.

This concentration of ownership has nonetheless raised concerns of possible anticompetitive behavior. A 2014 study titled "Anticompetitive Effects of Common Ownership" analyzed the effects of this type of common ownership on airline ticket prices. The study found that "Prices go up and quantity goes down when the airlines competing on a given route are more commonly owned by the same set of investors." The authors note that this price increase does not necessarily imply conscious collusion among the common owners, but could perhaps be that these firms are now "too lazy to compete" with themselves.

BlackRock is a shareholder in many institutional investors that own shares in BlackRock. This chain of ownership is similar to circular ownership structures which have been identified in the United Kingdom.

Finances 
As of 2021, BlackRock ranked 192 on the Fortune 500 list of the largest United States corporations by revenue.

In 2020, the non-profit American Economic Liberties Project issued a report highlighting the fact that "the 'Big Three' asset management firms—BlackRock, Vanguard and State Street—manage over $15 trillion in combined global assets under management, an amount equivalent to more than three-quarters of U.S. gross domestic product." The report called for structural reforms and better regulation of the financial markets. In 2021, BlackRock managed over $10 trillion in assets under management, about 40% of the GDP of the United States (nominal $25.347 trillion in 2022)

Mergers and acquisitions

BlackRock Solutions
In 2000, BlackRock launched BlackRock Solutions, the analytics and risk management division of BlackRock, Inc. The division grew from the Aladdin System (which is the enterprise investment system), Green Package (which is the Risk Reporting Service) PAG (portfolio analytics) and AnSer (which is the interactive analytics). BlackRock Solutions (BRS) serves two roles within BlackRock. First, BlackRock Solutions is the in-house investment analytics and “process engineering” department for BlackRock which works with their portfolio management teams, risk and quantitative analysis, business operations and every other part of the firm that touches the investment process.  Second, BlackRock Solutions (BRS) and the three primary divisions are services that are offered to institutional clients. As of 2013, the platform had nearly 2,000 employees.

BlackRock differentiates itself from other asset managers by claiming its risk management is not separate. Risk management is the foundation and cornerstone of the firm's entire platform. Aladdin keeps track of 30,000 investment portfolios, including BlackRock's own along with those of competitors, banks, pension funds, and insurers. According to The Economist, as at December 2013, the platform monitors almost 7 percent of the world's $225 trillion of financial assets.

BlackRock Solutions was retained by the U. S. Treasury Department in May 2009 to manage (i.e. analyze, unwind, and price) the toxic mortgage assets that were owned by Bear Stearns, AIG, Inc., Freddie Mac, Morgan Stanley, and other financial firms that were affected in the 2008 financial crisis.

Environmental, social and corporate governance investing 

In 2017, BlackRock expanded its presence in sustainable investing and environmental, social and corporate governance (ESG) with new staff and products both in the USA and Europe with the aim to lead the evolution of the financial sector in this regard.

BlackRock started using its weight to draw attention to environmental and diversity issues by means of official letters to CEOs and shareholder votes together with activist investors or investor networks like the Carbon Disclosure Project, which in 2017 backed a successful shareholder resolution for ExxonMobil to act on climate change. In 2018, it asked Russell 1000 companies to improve gender diversity on their board of directors if they had fewer than two women on them.

After discussions with firearms manufacturers and distributors, on April 5, 2018, BlackRock introduced two new exchange-traded funds (ETFs) that exclude stocks of gun makers and large gun retailers, Walmart, Dick's Sporting Goods, Kroger, Sturm Ruger, American Outdoor Brands Corporation, and Vista Outdoor, and removing the stocks from their seven existing ESG funds "to provide more choice for clients seeking to exclude firearms companies from their portfolios."

In August 2021, a former BlackRock executive who had served as the company's first global chief investment officer for sustainable investing, said he thought the firm's ESG investing was a "dangerous placebo that harms the public interest." The former executive said that financial institutions are motivated to engage in ESG investing because ESG products have higher fees, which in turn increase company profits.

In October 2021, the Wall Street Journal editorial board wrote that BlackRock was pushing the U.S. Securities and Exchange Commission to adopt rules requiring private companies to publicly disclose their climate impact, the diversity of their boards of directors, and other metrics. The editorial board opined that "ESG mandates, which also carry substantial litigation and reputational risks, will cause many companies to shun public markets. This would hurt stock exchanges and asset managers, but most of all retail investors."

In January 2022, BlackRock founder and CEO Larry Fink defended the company's focus on E.S.G. investing, pushing back "against accusations the asset manager was using its heft and influence to support a politically correct or progressive agenda." Fink said the practice of E.S.G. "is woke." According to The New York Times, BlackRock's emphasis on E.S.G. has drawn criticism as "either bowing to anti-business interests" or being "merely marketing". According to CNBC, some conservative groups and lawmakers have accused BlackRock of "woke posturing" to hide the company's funneling of money to Chinese companies. Meanwhile, environmental activists and groups have attacked the company for failing to divest from fossil fuel companies and other large contributors to climate change.

Global warming
As of December 2018, BlackRock was the world's largest investor in coal plant developers, holding shares worth $11 billion among 56 coal plant developers. and BlackRock owned more oil, gas, and thermal coal reserves than any other investor with total reserves amounting to 9.5 gigatonnes of  emissions or 30 percent of total energy-related emissions from 2017. Environmental groups including the Sierra Club and Amazon Watch launched a campaign in September 2018 called "BlackRock's Big Problem", claiming that BlackRock is the "biggest driver of climate destruction on the planet", due in part to its refusal to divest from fossil fuel companies. On January 10, 2020, a group of climate activists rushed inside the Paris offices of BlackRock France, painting walls and floors with warnings and accusations on the responsibility of the company in the current climate and social crises.

On January 14, 2020, BlackRock CEO Larry Fink said that environmental sustainability would be a key goal for investment decisions. BlackRock announced that it would sell $500 million worth of coal-related assets, and create funds that would avoid fossil-fuel stocks, two moves that would drastically shift the company's investment policy. Environmentalist Bill McKibben called this a "huge, if by no means final, win for activists." Nonetheless, BlackRock's support for shareholder resolutions requesting climate risk disclosure fell from 25% in 2019 to 14% in 2020 according to Morningstar Proxy Data.

EU banking rules
The European Ombudsman opened an inquiry in May 2020 to inspect the commission's file on the European Commission's decision to award a contract to BlackRock Investment Management to carry out a study on integrating environmental, social and governance risks and objectives into EU banking rules ('the prudential framework'). European Parliament members questioned the impartiality of the world's largest asset manager given its investments already in the sector.

West Virginia

Riley Moore, the State Treasurer of West Virginia, said in June 2022 that BlackRock and five other financial institutions would no longer be allowed to do business with the state of West Virginia, because of their advocacy against the fossil fuel industry. Moore said, "At a time when energy demand is skyrocketing and consumers are bearing the brunt of generationally high inflation, it makes absolutely no sense for financial institutions to cut off capital and financing to these legal, profitable industries simply because they don’t align with their radical social and political agendas."

Florida 
In December 2022 chief financial officer of Florida Jimmy Patronis announced that the government of Florida would be divesting $2 billion worth of investments under management by BlackRock, due to the firm's move to strengthen ESG standards and ESG policies. BlackRock later responded to the announcement with a statement stating that the divestment would place politics over investor interest.

Investments in China

In August 2021, BlackRock set up its first mutual fund in China after raising over one billion dollars from 111,000 Chinese investors. BlackRock became the first foreign-owned company allowed by the Chinese government to operate a wholly-owned business in China's mutual fund industry. Writing in The Wall Street Journal, George Soros described BlackRock's initiative in China as a "tragic mistake" that would "damage the national security interests of the U.S. and other democracies."

In October 2021, non-profit group Consumers' Research launched an ad campaign criticizing BlackRock's relationship with the Chinese government.

In December 2021, it was reported that BlackRock was an investor in two companies that had been blacklisted by the US government for human rights abuses against the Uyghurs in Xinjiang. In one case (Hikvision) BlackRock increased its level of investment after the company's blacklisting.

Investments in India 
The firm maintains a dedicated India Fund, through which it invests in Indian start-ups like Byju's, Paytm, and Pine Labs. As of late 2021, it is lowering its investment in India while increasing investment in China.

Public perception 
In his 2018 annual letter to shareholders, BlackRock CEO Larry Fink wrote that other CEOs should be aware of their impact on society. Anti-war organizations objected to Fink's statement, given that BlackRock is the largest investor in weapon manufacturers through its iShares U.S. Aerospace and Defense ETF. In May 2018, anti-war organizations held a demonstration outside the annual BlackRock shareholders' meeting in Manhattan, New York.

The firm has also been criticized regarding climate change inaction and deforestation in the Amazon. According to The New Republic, BlackRock "has positioned itself as the good guy on Wall Street, and its executives as a crew of mild-mannered money managers who understand the risks of the climate crisis and the importance of diversity. But those commitments, critics say, only extend so far into the firm's day-to-day operations."

Due to its power and the sheer size and scope of its financial assets and activities, BlackRock has been called the world's largest shadow bank. In 2020, U.S. Representatives Katie Porter and Jesús "Chuy" García proposed a U.S. House bill aiming to restrain BlackRock and other so-called shadow banks. On March 4, 2021, U.S. Senator Elizabeth Warren suggested that BlackRock should be designated "too big to fail".

BlackRock was scrutinized for allegedly taking advantage of its close ties with the Federal Reserve System during the COVID-19 pandemic response efforts. In June 2020, The New Republic wrote that BlackRock "was having a very good pandemic" and was casting "itself as socially responsible while contributing to the climate catastrophe, evading regulatory scrutiny, and angling to influence [a potential] Biden administration." The Financial Times described BlackRock having secured a prominent advisory role in the Fed’s post-COVID asset purchase program, prompting concerns over whether BlackRock would use its influence to encourage the Fed to purchase BlackRock products; during the Fed's 2020 quantitative easing program, BlackRock’s corporate bond ETF received $4.3 billion in new investment, compared to the respective $33 million and $15 million received by BlackRock's competitors Vanguard Group and State Street.

Key people

As of 2021, Blackrock had an eighteen-person board of directors. They were:

 Larry Fink – founder, chairman and CEO
 Bader M. Alsaad
 Pamela Daley
 Jessica P. Einhorn
 Beth Ford
 William E. Ford
 Fabrizio Freda
 Murry S. Gerber
 Margaret "Peggy" L. Johnson
 Robert S. Kapito – founder and co-president
 Cheryl D. Mills
 Gordon M. Nixon
 Kristin Peck
 Charles H. Robbins
 Carlos Slim Domit
 Hans V. Vestberg
 Susan Wagner – founder, member of the board
 Mark Wilson

People who have previously served on the Blackrock board of directors include:

 Brian Deese - former Global Head of Sustainable Investing
 Blake Grossman, former vice chairman

See also

 Companies listed on the New York Stock Exchange (B)
 Charles Hallac
 List of asset management firms
 List of CDO managers
 List of companies based in New York City
 List of hedge funds
 List of mutual-fund families in the United States
 List of S&P 500 companies

References

Further reading

External links

 

 
1988 establishments in New York (state)
1999 initial public offerings
Companies based in Manhattan
Companies listed on the New York Stock Exchange
Financial services companies based in New York City
Financial services companies established in 1988
Investment management companies of the United States
Multinational companies based in New York City
Publicly traded companies based in New York City